Belgrano Cargas y Logística S.A., trading as Trenes Argentinos Cargas, is an Argentine State-owned company which operates a  freight rail network that includes Belgrano, Urquiza and San Martín railways. It is a subsidiary of Trenes Argentinos.

It is often erroneously called Belgrano Cargas by the Argentine government and press, despite the freight network encompassing numerous other Argentine railways, of which the General Belgrano Railway is only one.

Overview 
The network extends through the provinces of Buenos Aires, Santa Fe, Córdoba, Mendoza, Santiago del Estero, San Juan, La Rioja, Catamarca, Tucumán, Chaco, Formosa, Salta and Jujuy. The line also reaches all the Argentina's neighbouring countries, such as Bolivia, Uruguay, Brazil, Chile and Paraguay.

TACyL currently operates 122 locomotives and 7,392 goods wagons, employing 3,140 workers whose jobs are guaranteed by the National government. In 2007, its predecessor Belgrano Cargas had transported nearly one million tonnes of merchandise, a figure which increased to over 3 million tonnes in 2014 following nationalisation.

History 
In 2008, the Government of Argentina ceased the concession granted to Belgrano Cargas S.A. to operate the 7,347 km. of Belgrano Railway's freight network. "Belgrano Cargas y Logística" was established in May 2013 by National decree, to take over Belgrano's freight services, formerly operated by Belgrano Cargas. In June that same year the company also took over some services from Urquiza (2,704 km) and San Martín (5,254 km) railways.

That same year the National Government also rescinded the contract signed with América Latina Logística (ALL), taking over the services previously granted to the company, such as Urquiza and San Martín freight services that had been managed by ALL until then. The Government alleged that ALL had not complied with the terms of the contract, previously noted by the General Auditing Office of Argentina.

Soon after nationalisation, the government began looking to expand the fleet of the company and began making orders both domestically and abroad. One order consisted of 1000 freight wagons from Argentine state-owned company Fabricaciones Militares. The company also ordered 100 locomotives and 3,500 carriages from China as part of a plan that also included the purchase of 30,000 rails to repair parts of the line.

In September 2015, the Government of Argentina announced the completion of the 100 new diesel locomotives by Chinese CRRC Corporation, being the first locomotives purchased exclusively for freight transport in Argentina. Later that month the Ministry of the Interior and Transport, together with China Machinery Engineering Corporation, announced that the original Chinese investment of US$2.4 billion in the Argentine freight network was being doubled to US$4.8 billion and new purchases and infrastructure projects would ensue.

In August 2016, the first brand-new locomotive manufactured by CRRC was finished, as part of a total of 20 units that will be export to Argentina.

See also
 Belgrano Cargas (former freight company)
 Ferrocarriles Argentinos (2015)
 Rail transport in Argentina
 San Martín Railway
 Urquiza Railway
 Belgrano Railway

References

External links

 

Railway companies of Argentina
Metre gauge railways in Argentina
Railway companies established in 2013
Government-owned railway companies